Daniel Lee Aiken (born August 28, 1988) is a former American football long snapper. He was signed by the Buffalo Bills as an undrafted free agent in 2011. He played college football at Virginia after a prep year at Fork Union Military Academy.

Early years
While attending Cave Spring High School, Aiken lettered in football. During his high school career, he played on the defensive line, at quarterback, and in his early years on junior varsity he played offensive line. At quarterback in his senior year, he led the Knights to a 9–1 regular season record. Their only loss coming against the Salem Spartans (state champions that year) who won the game 7-6 in a controversial finish. The Knights finished the year with a 1–1 playoff record, defeating Brookville (led by future Virginia Tech quarterback Logan Thomas) in the regional semifinals before falling in the regional championship game to top-seeded and undefeated Liberty, finishing the season at 10-2.

He attended Fork Union Military Academy as a postgraduate, where he gained experience as a long snapper.

College career
He played college football at the University of Virginia, was the team's long snapper all four years, and was a reserve tight end but caught no passes while there, he played under coach Mike London.

NFL career

Buffalo Bills
In May 2011, the Buffalo Bills signed him as an undrafted free agent, he was waived by the team in August 2011.

New England Patriots
The New England Patriots claimed him off waivers on September 4, 2011, and he was named the team's starting long snapper and an emergency tight end.

On March 7, 2014, Aiken was re-signed to a 1-year contract. He was released from the team on August 30, 2014, but re-signed on September 4. On February 1, 2015, Aiken won Super Bowl XLIX with the Patriots. At the conclusion of the 2014-2015 season Aiken was not resigned by the Patriots due to back surgery and their drafting of Joe Cardona in the 2015 NFL Draft to be the team's new long snapper.

Carolina Panthers
Aiken was signed by the Carolina Panthers on November 25, 2015 after an injury to the Panthers long snapper J. J. Jansen. On November 27, 2015, Aiken was waived.

New York Giants
On December 8, 2015, Aiken was signed as a free agent by the New York Giants to replace long snapper Zak DeOssie, who suffered a wrist injury and was placed on season-ending injured reserve. On December 31, 2015, Aiken was placed on season-ending injured reserve due to a thumb injury, and was replaced by Tyler Ott.

Personal life
Aiken is currently married to Kelly Pierson Aiken. While not officially retired from the NFL, Aiken became the head coach of the Virginia Episcopal School football team for the 2018 season.

References

External links
Virginia Cavaliers bio

1988 births
Living people
Sportspeople from Roanoke, Virginia
Players of American football from Virginia
American football long snappers
Virginia Cavaliers football players
Buffalo Bills players
New England Patriots players
Carolina Panthers players
New York Giants players